Trichodactylidae is a family of crabs, in its own superfamily, Trichodactyloidea. They are all freshwater animals from Central and South America, including some offshore islands, such as Ilhabela, São Paulo. Only one of the 50 species is known from the fossil record, Sylviocarcinus piriformis from the Miocene of Colombia. The family contains 15 genera in two subfamilies:
Subfamily Dilocarcininae Pretzmann, 1978
Bottiella Magalhães & Türkay, 1996
Dilocarcinus H. Milne-Edwards, 1853
Forsteria Bott, 1969
Fredilocarcinus Pretzmann, 1978
Goyazana Bott, 1969
Melocarcinus Magalhães & Türkay, 1996
Moreirocarcinus Magalhães & Türkay, 1996
Poppiana Bott, 1969
Rotundovaldivia Pretzmann, 1968
Sylviocarcinus H. Milne-Edwards, 1853
Valdivia White, 1847
Zilchiopsis Bott, 1969
Subfamily Trichodactylinae H. Milne-Edwards, 1853
Avotrichodactylus Pretzmann, 1968
Rodriguezia Bott, 1969
Trichodactylus Latreille, 1829

References

External links

Crabs
Freshwater crustaceans of South America
Extant Miocene first appearances
Taxa named by Henri Milne-Edwards
Decapod families